Suleri Palya  is a village in the southern state of Karnataka, India. It is located in the Kollegal taluk of Chamarajanagar district.

Demographics
 India census, Suleri Palya had a population of 5967 with 3084 males and 2883 females.

See also
 Chamarajanagar
 Districts of Karnataka

References

External links
 http://Chamarajanagar.nic.in/

Villages in Chamarajanagar district